Jake Edward Turner (born 25 February 1999) is an English professional footballer who plays as a goalkeeper for League Two club Gillingham.

Early life
Turner was born in Wilmslow, and grew up with older sister Millie, who is also a footballer.

Club career
Turner began his career at Bolton Wanderers, moving on loan to Stalybridge Celtic in December 2017, but was recalled without making a first-team appearance. He then moved on loan to Frickley Athletic in March 2018. He returned on loan to Stalybridge in August 2018, making 11 league and 1 cup appearances. He moved on loan to Darlington in March 2019.

He signed for Newcastle United in July 2019, saying he was persuaded to do so by former Bolton teammate Sammy Ameobi, who had begun his career at Newcastle. In August 2020 he moved on a season-long loan to Morecambe. He was recalled by Newcastle in January 2021.

On 7 August 2021, he joined League Two club Colchester United on loan until January 2022. He made his club debut on 7 September in Colchester's 1–0 EFL Trophy defeat to Gillingham. He became first-choice goalkeeper after an injury to Shamal George, and was praised by local media for his performances. The loan ended in January 2022.

On 30 June 2022, Turner signed for League Two side Gillingham.

International career
He made his debut for England U18 in November 2016, and also played at under-19 level.

References

1999 births
Living people
People from Wilmslow
English footballers
England youth international footballers
Association football goalkeepers
Bolton Wanderers F.C. players
Stalybridge Celtic F.C. players
Frickley Athletic F.C. players
Darlington F.C. players
Newcastle United F.C. players
Morecambe F.C. players
Colchester United F.C. players
Gillingham F.C. players
English Football League players
National League (English football) players